Elisabetta Cocciaretto and Nicoleta Dascălu were the defending champions but chose not to participate.

Andrea Gámiz and Eva Vedder won the title, defeating Estelle Cascino and Camilla Rosatello in the final, 7–5, 2–6, [13–11].

Seeds

Draw

Draw

References

External Links
Main Draw

Torneo Internazionale Femminile Antico Tiro a Volo - Doubles